David Beecroft (born April 26, 1955) is an American actor noted for his television appearances, having played both regular and recurring roles in series such as Falcon Crest (as Nick Agretti), Dr. Quinn, Medicine Woman and Melrose Place.

Early life and education 
Beecroft was born in Warwick, Rhode Island. He graduated from W. T. White High School in Dallas, Texas, in 1974. He graduated from Trinity University in San Antonio, Texas, before moving to Hollywood in 1979.

Career 
In 1992, he starred on the short-lived series Hearts are Wild. He has also been a regular on the daytime soap operas One Life to Live as Trent Chapin (1985–1986) and All My Children from 1999 to 2001. He played the serial killer in 1990's The Rain Killer, and a gigolo in 1987's Creepshow 2.

Personal life 
Beecroft's older brother is actor Gregory Beecroft. He and his wife have one son.

Filmography

Film

Television

References

External links

1955 births
People from Warwick, Rhode Island
American male film actors
American male soap opera actors
American male television actors
Living people
Male actors from Rhode Island
W. T. White High School alumni